Boulware is a surname.  It may refer to:

 People 
 Ben Boulware, American football player 
 Bill Boulware, American television producer of One on One (TV series), co-creator of 227 (TV series) 
 Caldwell Elwood Boulware (1909–1990), long time mathematics professor at North Carolina Central University, active in the American civil rights movement in the south, first African American Trustee at Duke University, elected to multiple terms of the Durham, NC City Council
 John Boulware, American settler (1850s) of Nebraska City, Nebraska, United States 
 J. W. Boulware, first commander (1944) of the USS Heywood L. Edwards (DD-663)
 Harold R. Boulware (1913–1983), American judge, most famous for being on the team with Thurgood Marshal that won Brown v. Board of Education
 Lemuel Boulware (1895–1990), V.P. of G.E. who lent his name to "Boulwarism".
 Mark Boulware, American Ambassador to Mauritania (see Mauritania-United States relations) 
 Michael Boulware, American football player, brother of Peter Boulware 
 Peter Boulware, American football player 
 William Boulware, United States Ambassador to Italy in the 1840s 
 William Boulware Jr., American professional wrestler known as Rocky King 
 Colonel William T. Boulware, killer (1843) of Peter Whetstone in Marshall, Texas, United States

 Other 
 Boulware Cemetery in Franklin Township, Bourbon County, Kansas, United States 
 Boulware Dormitory, Barber-Scotia College, Concord, North Carolina 
 Boulware Springs Water Works, historic site in Gainesville, Florida, United States